The Athletes in Action/Bart Starr Award is given annually to a National Football League (NFL) player who "best exemplifies outstanding character and leadership in the home, on the field, and in the community." Nominees are gathered from the public relations directors of each NFL team, the past winners of the award, the Athletes in Action Pro Staff working with NFL teams, and, before his death, Bart Starr himself. Ballots are sent to each team and voting takes place at the same time as the Pro Bowl selections. The votes are tabulated and the winner is announced at the annual Super Bowl Breakfast, an NFL-sanctioned event hosted by Athletes in Action, the sports ministry of Campus Crusade for Christ. The award, bearing the name of Hall of Fame Green Bay Packers quarterback Bart Starr, honors his lifelong commitment to serving as a positive role model to his family, teammates, and community.

Winners

Notes 
 Winners are listed by year awarded in given not the season. For example, 1989 winner Steve Largent was given the award after the 1988 NFL season.
 Atlanta Falcons safety Eugene Robinson won the award for the 1998 NFL season, but was arrested the very same evening he received the award in Miami, Florida for soliciting a female undercover police officer posing as a prostitute. This occurred on the eve of the Falcons' game against the Denver Broncos in Super Bowl XXXIII. Robinson agreed to return the award.

See also 
List of National Football League awards
Walter Payton NFL Man of the Year Award
"Whizzer" White NFL Man of the Year Award

References

External links
Super Bowl Breakfast - Bart Starr Award

National Football League trophies and awards